The director of the United States Mint is a presidential appointment that requires a Senate confirmation. The incumbent is Ventris Gibson, who became director of the Mint on June 22, 2022, after serving in acting capacity.

When the position of the director is vacant, the senior career (non-political) official of the mint serves as the acting director. Until the appointment of Ryder as director, the Mint had been without an official director since the resignation of Edmund C. Moy in 2011. Richard A. Peterson succeeded Moy. Peterson served between January 2011 and March 2017. The longest serving director was Nellie Ross. Ross, who had earlier been the first female governor in American history while serving the state of Wyoming, was director from 1933 until 1953. 

In July 2015, Matthew Rhett Jeppson was nominated by President Barack Obama to become the Mint's 39th director and was given the temporary title of principal deputy director. However, the nomination was never confirmed by the Senate. Jeppson stepped down as principal deputy director in January 2017, then replaced by acting principal deputy director David Motl.

The office of director has existed since the creation of the Mint by the Coinage Act of 1792. Initially appointed serving at the pleasure of the president of the United States, the Coinage Act of 1873 specified a five-year term for directors. The director operates with general directions provided by the United States Secretary of the Treasury.

List of directors of the United States Mint

See also
United States Mint
Treasurer of the United States
Chief Engraver of the United States Mint
Director of the Bureau of Engraving and Printing
Master of the Mint
Warden of the Mint
Master of the Mint (Canada)
Moneyers of the Roman Republic

References

 

 
United States Department of the Treasury
1792 establishments in the United States